Montenegro competed at the 2007 World Aquatics Championships in Melbourne, Australia.

Swimming

2 swimmers represented Montenegro:

Women

References

Nations at the 2007 World Aquatics Championships
2007 in Montenegrin sport
Montenegro at the World Aquatics Championships